
This is a list of NJPW Strong episodes including episode number, location, venue and that night's main event. The episodes are branded, usually 3–4 weeks at a time, to mimic the normal touring schedule of the main promotion. Prior to September 2021, other episodes before these events were mainly branded as "Road to" shows.

All dates, venues and main events are per the "results" page on the official NJPW website.

2020

2021

2022

2023

See also 

 List of NJPW Strong special episodes
 List of AEW Dynamite episodes
 List of AEW Dark episodes
 List of AEW Dark: Elevation episodes
 List of WWE Raw special episodes
 List of WWE SmackDown special episodes

References 

New Japan Pro-Wrestling
New Japan Pro-Wrestling shows
Professional wrestling-related lists